Mary Beth Iagorashvili (née Larsen) (born July 28, 1974 in Waukesha, Wisconsin) is a retired American modern pentathlete. She is also the first U.S. female modern pentathlete and one of the twenty-four athletes to participate in the first-ever women's event at the 2000 Summer Olympics in Sydney. In 1999, she married Georgian-born modern pentathlete Vakhtang Iagorashvili, who won an individual bronze medal at the 1988 Summer Olympics in Seoul.

Iagorashvili emerged as one of the top favorites to win the women's modern pentathlon in the early 2000s. She won the gold medal at the 1999 Pan American Games in Winnipeg, Manitoba, Canada, and bronze at the 2003 Pan American Games in Santo Domingo, Dominican Republic, which both obtained her qualifying places for the Olympic games. With her husband being ineligible to compete because of citizenship issues, Iagorashvili competed in Sydney for the Olympic games, and finished fourth in the women's event with a score of 5,129 points. Following her fourth-place finish, Iagorashvili continued to build her success in modern pentathlon, as she became the national champion in 2002.

Iagorashvili later competed with her husband Vakhtang at the 2004 Summer Olympics in Athens, after winning medals at the Pan American Games. She finished fifteenth in the women's event with a score of 5,052 points.

After the Olympics, Iagorashvili retired from her sport, and after graduating from Logan College of Chiropractic in December 2001, began her practice in Texas, Minnesota, and Wisconsin.

References

External links
 Fivefold Talent
 
 
 
 Profile – Pentathlon.org
 Profile – Parker University

1974 births
Living people
American female modern pentathletes
Olympic modern pentathletes of the United States
Modern pentathletes at the 2000 Summer Olympics
Modern pentathletes at the 2004 Summer Olympics
Sportspeople from Waukesha, Wisconsin
American chiropractors
Sportspeople from the Milwaukee metropolitan area
Pan American Games gold medalists for the United States
Pan American Games bronze medalists for the United States
Pan American Games medalists in modern pentathlon
Logan University alumni
Modern pentathletes at the 1999 Pan American Games
Modern pentathletes at the 2003 Pan American Games
Medalists at the 2003 Pan American Games
20th-century American women
21st-century American women